The Aguilar family of Ocotlán de Morelos are from a rural town in the state of Oaxaca, Mexico. This town produced only utilitarian items until Isaura Alcantara Diaz began creating decorative figures with her husband Jesus Aguila Revilla. The couple taught their five daughters who continued innovating their own styles and then teaching the two generations after them. Two of the sisters, Guilliermina and Irene have been named “grand masters” by the Fomento Cultural Banamex, for their figures and sets of figures related to the life and traditions of Oaxaca, as well as Mexican icons such as Frida Kahlo and the Virgin of Guadalupe. The younger generations have made their own adaptations with some attaining their own recognition such as Lorenzo Demetrio García Aguilar and Jose Francisco Garcia Vazquez.

Isaura Alcantara Diaz
Isaura Alcantara Diaz (1924-1968) was the original innovator, who made pottery with her husband Jesus Aguila Revilla. Prior to this, the ceramics of Ocotlan de Morelos was limited to utilitarian items such as dishes and cookware. However, Isaura thought to make decorative human figures, with the husband began drawing on paper and she executed. These figures depict daily activities and other expression of rural village life in Oaxaca, with great detail and vivid colors. Women are generally shown in indigenous garb performing activities such as carrying items, nursing babies, selling in the market and participating in life celebrations. The decorative pieces with their colors and detail came into demand by Mexican folk art collectors including Nelson Rockefeller, who purchased dozens of these pieces in the 1960s and 1970s. Many of these are not in the collections of the San Antonio Museum of Art and the Mexican Museum in San Francisco.   Isaura died in 1969 at the age of forty four.

Second generation
The couple had four daughters Guillermina, Josefina, Irene and Concepcion, who began learning ceramics young as assistants to their mother. They learned their mother’s new style, and as they became older adapted and expanded the repertoire to include images of Frida Kahlo, the Virgin of Guadalupe and even prostitutes. These innovations are due in part to the popularity of the pieces among international tourists, a number of which visit the sisters’ studios. These women, in turn, have taught their children and even their grandchildren.

Guillermina and Irene Aguilar

The better known of the four are Guillermina and Irene Aguilar, who have received numerous award and were featured together in the book Grandes Maestros del Arte Popular Mexicano (2001) by the Fomento Cultural Banamex. Works by Guillermina and Irene Aguilar were also exhibited as part of the Grandes Maestros del Arte Popular de Oaxaca in 2012. The sisters  create pieces that are painted with bright colors, completely unpainted or some combination of the two. These include various human figures, skeletal figures for Day of the Dead, candle holder, incense burners, angels and religious items. Both have similar methods for creating their works, using white, red and sand colored clays. Bodies of figures are made by first creating disks of clay, then folding them. After this is burnished, details are added such as faces, hands, etc. Sometimes they use molds but the final touches are always by hand and then use both natural and commercial enamel paints with commercial and handmade brushes.

Guillermina first original works included ducks, chickens, bulls and other animals. She then began to create miniatures scenes such as nativities, weddings, dances, wakes, baptisms and more, based on the customs of Oaxaca.  Guillermina’s work also includes large, medium and small female figures with highly detailed dress, including jewelry, engaged in everyday activities. She also creates nearly one-meter high trees of life and bells with animal heads. She considers the expressive faces she is able to create to be her greatest contribution.
Irene considers herself a perfectionist and initially took longer than Guillermina to create new pieces. However, her work caught the attention of the Nuevo Mexico gallery, which ordered 120 pieces to mount and exhibition. She also creates scenes of traditional and customs of the villages and towns of the region. However she also creates solitary female figures, which have made her known in the United States, principally of Frida Kahlo, women with calla lilies, musicians, devils, monks, prostitutes, Catrinas and mother earth images covered in foliage. Another of her important pieces is called a “fuente del amor” (lit. fountain of love). These began as fruit holders with birds and flowers and one day she added human images. The piece eventually morphed into a decorative piece on its own.  Irene has participated in various exhibitions in various places in the United States such as Chicago, Houston, Arizona, Colorado, Dallas and New Mexico. Her work has also been exhibited in other countries such as Colombia and Canada.

Josefina and Concepción

Josefina creates male and female human figures which she called “muñecas” (dolls), following the style of her parents, in many kinds of activities, venues and dress. Her specialties include headdresses, mermaids, crosses, prostitutes, the Last Supper and people in the town square. These are made individually and as part of sets depicting events such as weddings, funerals and people in a park.

Concepción works with her husband Jorge Sánchez Ruiz. Her work contains great detail, mostly related to nature. While she uses pictures for inspiration, she does not copy what they contain. She is noted for her scenes depicting Noah’s Ark and figures depicting Frida Kahlo.

Later generations

The four sisters have taught pottery skills to their children, who have gone on to create their own variations. Some have them have gone on to be notable in their own right.

Lorenzo Demetrio García Aguilar is the son of Josefina. He has taken his mother’s style but has made it more surreal. He also creates “muñecas” and plaques, along with interpretations of religious, cultural and family themes, such as those related to the Garden of Eden and Day of the Dead. He also created a portrait of his mother in clay. Specialties include Frida Kahlo and skeleton pieces with different expressions. He generally creates all pieces himself but his wife occasionally helps with painting.  He is featured along with Josefina in CRIZMAC’s Fantastic Figures: Oaxacan Ceramic Folk Art VHS/DVD. He frequently travels to the United States to work with schools, museums and universities.

Jose Francisco Garcia Vazquez is the son of Lorenzo Demetrio and the grandson of Josefina. In 2008, he won an honorable mention in ceramics at the Friends of Oaxaca Folk Art’s young artists competition. His works often depict alarms about the world’s problems such as the work “Famine” which depicts a dead baby in its mother’s arms.

See also
List of Mexican artisans

Museum Collections 

 Art Museum of Southeast Texas, Beaumont, Texas

References

Mexican potters